Turkey Point Provincial Park is located in Turkey Point, Ontario, Canada and is part of the Ontario Parks system.  It is the only Ontario provincial park to include a golf course.  The Normandale Fish Hatchery is in the park, and is accessible via one of the hiking trails.

References

External links
 

Provincial parks of Ontario
Protected areas of Norfolk County, Ontario
Year of establishment missing